James Douglas Lind (born February 19, 1985) is a Canadian curler and coach. He led three different Japanese curling club teams at Olympic Games in 2014 Sochi and in 2018 PyeongChang as the national coach, and brought five bronze medals to Japanese women's team in 2018.

Career

As a player
Lind started his career as a curler at junior teams.
He is the runner up skip position at Twin Anchors Houseboats Vacations / Prestige Inn Classic in 2004.
He is the winner of 2011 World Financial Group Classic as the third position of Team Virtue.
In 2012, he got silver medals
at Boston Pizza Cup as the third of Team Virtue
and
at HDF Insurance Shoot-Out as the third of Team Thomas.

As a coach
He started the career as a coach for Team Thomas at Canadian Junior Curling Championships in 2007.
From 2013 to 2016, he worked as the head coach of three years course; Hokkaido Women's Curling Academy in Sapporo.

At the games of curling at the 2014 Winter Olympics – Women's tournament,
he led Japanese women's team , in Sapporo City, Hokkaido Island,
which resulted 4th in round robin standing.

At the games of curling at the 2018 Winter Olympics – Women's tournament,
he led Japanese women's team , in Tokoro Town, Kitami City, Hokkaido Island
to bronze medal.
He also coached Japanese men's team , in Karuizawa Town, Nagano Prefecture
at the games of curling at the 2018 Winter Olympics – Men's tournament, which resulted 8th final standing.

Personal life
Lind is married and has one son. He is an inductee to the Southern Alberta Curling Hall of Fame.

References

External links

 Curling  Coach Profile: J. D. Lind  - 2018 Winter Olympics
 Twitter: J.D. Lind - Coaching curling in Japan
 Instagram: J.D. Lind - National Coach for the Japanese Curling Association
 Japan Curling Association (in Japanese)
 Hokkaido Bank Fortius in Sapporo, Hokkaido (in Japanese, 2014 Olympians coached by J. D. Lind)
 Loco Solare; Tokoro Curling Team in Kitami, Hokkaido (in Japanese, 2018 bronze medal Olympians coached by J. D. Lind)
 Sports Community Karuizawa Club in Karuizawa, Nagano (in Japanese, 2018 Olympians coached by J. D. Lind)

Canadian male curlers
Curlers from Calgary
Living people
1985 births
Canadian curling coaches